Manguel is a surname. Notable people with the surname include:

 Alberto Manguel (born 1948), Argentine writer
 Romina Manguel, Argentine radio host and journalist

See also
 Manuel (name)